CIFF may refer to:

Film festivals
Cairo International Film Festival
Calgary International Film Festival
Calgary Independent Film Festival
Cambodia International Film Festival
Canberra International Film Festival
Chennai International Film Festival
Cinekambiya International Film Festival
Cleveland International Film Festival

Other
Camera Image File Format
CIFF-FM, a Canadian radio station
The Children's Investment Fund Foundation, a UK charity